Anne Benjaminsen (born 25 March 1964) is a Finnish ski-orienteering competitor and World Champion. 

She participated at the 1988 World Ski Orienteering Championships in Kuopio, and won a gold medal in the relay with the Finnish team, with the teammates Sirpa Kukkonen and Virpi Juutilainen. She placed fifth in the classic distance, and eight in the short distance.

Personal life
Benjaminsen is married to Norwegian orienteer Vidar Benjaminsen. Norwegian figure skater Juni Marie Benjaminsen and Norwegian orienteer Andrine Benjaminsen are their children.

See also
 Finnish orienteers
 List of orienteers
 List of orienteering events

References

Finnish orienteers
Female orienteers
Ski-orienteers
1964 births
Living people
Finnish expatriates in Norway